Nominal Pipe Size (NPS) is a North American set of standard sizes for pipes used for high or low pressures and temperatures. "Nominal" refers to pipe in non-specific terms and identifies the diameter of the hole with a non-dimensional number (for example – 2-inch nominal steel pipe" consists of many varieties of steel pipe with the only criterion being a  outside diameter). Specific pipe is identified by pipe diameter and another non-dimensional number for wall thickness referred to as the Schedule (Sched. or Sch., for example – "2-inch diameter pipe, Schedule 40"). NPS is often incorrectly called National Pipe Size, due to confusion with the American standard for pipe threads, "national pipe straight", which also abbreviates as "NPS". The European and international designation equivalent to NPS is DN (diamètre nominal/nominal diameter/Nennweite), in which sizes are measured in millimetres, see ISO 6708. The term NB (nominal bore) is also frequently used interchangeably with DN.

In March 1927 the American Standards Association authorized a committee to standardize the dimensions of wrought steel and wrought iron pipe and tubing. At that time only a small selection of wall thicknesses were in use: standard weight (STD), extra-strong (XS), and double extra-strong (XXS), based on the iron pipe size (IPS) system of the day. However these three sizes did not fit all applications. Also, in 1939, it was hoped that the designations of STD, XS, and XXS would be phased out by schedule numbers, however those original terms are still in common use today (although sometimes referred to as standard, extra-heavy (XH), and double extra-heavy (XXH), respectively). Since the original schedules were created, there have been many revisions and additions to the tables of pipe sizes based on industry use and on standards from API, ASTM, and others.

Stainless steel pipes, which were coming into more common use in the mid 20th century, permitted the use of thinner pipe walls with much less risk of failure due to corrosion. By 1949 thinner schedules 5S and 10S, which were based on the pressure requirements modified to the nearest BWG number, had been created, and other "S" sizes followed later. Due to their thin walls, the smaller "S" sizes can not be threaded together according to ASME code, but must be fusion welded, brazed, roll grooved, or joined with press fittings.

Application 

Based on the NPS and schedule of a pipe, the pipe outside diameter (OD) and wall thickness can be obtained from reference tables such as those below, which are based on ASME standards B36.10M and B36.19M. However, the NPS and OD values are not always equal, which can create confusion.

 For NPS  to 12, the NPS and OD values are different. For example, the OD of an NPS 12 pipe is actually . To find the actual OD for each NPS value, refer to the tables below. (Note that for tubing, the size indicates actual dimensions, not nominal.)
 For NPS 14 and up, the NPS and OD values are equal. In other words, an NPS 14 pipe is actually  OD.

The reason for the discrepancy for NPS  to 12 inches is that these NPS values were originally set to give the same inside diameter (ID) based on wall thicknesses standard at the time. However, as the set of available wall thicknesses evolved, the ID changed and NPS became only indirectly related to ID and OD.

For a given NPS, the OD stays fixed and the wall thickness increases with schedule. For a given schedule, the OD increases with NPS while the wall thickness stays constant or increases. Using equations and rules in ASME B31.3 Process Piping, it can be shown that pressure rating decreases with increasing NPS and constant schedule.

Some specifications use pipe schedules called standard wall (STD), extra strong (XS), and double extra strong (XXS), although these actually belong to an older system called iron pipe size (IPS). The IPS number is the same as the NPS number. STD is identical to SCH 40S, and 40S is identical to 40 for NPS  to NPS 10, inclusive. XS is identical to SCH 80S, and 80S is identical to 80 for NPS  to NPS 8, inclusive. XXS wall is thicker than schedule 160 from NPS  in to NPS 6 in inclusive, and schedule 160 is thicker than XXS wall for NPS 8 in and larger.

Blockage or ball test 
When a pipe is welded or bent the most common method to inspect blockages, misalignment, ovality, and weld bead dimensional conformity is to pass a round ball through the pipe coil or circuit. If the inner pipe dimension is to be measured then the weld bead should be subtracted, if welding is applicable. Typically, the clearance tolerance for the ball must not exceed . Allowable ovality of any pipe is measured on the inside dimension of the pipe, normally 5% to 10% ovality can be accepted. If no other test is conducted to verify ovality, or blockages, this test must be seen as a standard requirement. A flow test can not be used in lieu of a blockage or ball test. See pipe dimensional table, Specification ASME B36.10M or B36.19M for pipe dimensions per schedule.

Stainless steel pipe is most often available in standard weight sizes (noted by the S designation; for example, NPS Sch 10S). However stainless steel pipe can also be available in other schedules.

Both polyvinyl chloride pipe (PVC) and chlorinated polyvinyl chloride pipe (CPVC) are made in NPS sizes.

NPS tables for selected sizes

NPS  to NPS  

DN does not exactly correspond to a size in millimeters, because ISO 6708 defines it as being a dimensionless specification only indirectly related to a diameter. The ISO 6708 sizes provide a metric name for existing inch sizes, resulting in a 1:1 correlation between NPS and DN sizes. ISO 6708 does not include values for "DN 6" or "DN 8", however ASME B36.10M list the "DN 6" and "DN 8" . Also, the European Standard EN 12 516-1 (Industrial valves - Shell design strength - Part 1: Tabulation method for steel valve shells) specifies the dimensions "DN 6" and "DN 8", respectively their equivalents NPS  "and NPS ". 

Tolerance:  The tolerance on pipe OD is + (0.0156) inch, − (0.0312) inch.

As per ASME B36.10M -2018 Pipe wall thickness are rounded to nearest , while converting wall thickness from inch to millimetre.

NPS 4 to NPS 9

NPS 10 to NPS 24

NPS 26 to NPS 36

Additional sizes (NPS)

See also 

 British standard pipe thread sizes
 Copper tubing sizes
 Pipe thread sizes
 National pipe thread sizes
 Pipe (fluid conveyance)
 Pipe sizes
 Standard dimension ratio

Notes

References

Bibliography

External links 

 Notes on Pipe—PVC Pipe weights and max PSI
 Quick calculator to determine standard pipe dimensions For Carbon Steel and Stainless Steel pipes as per ANSI. (Requires Membership)

Piping
Mechanical standards
Customary units of measurement in the United States